

Common Name 

Eightbar grouper

Habitat 

Salt water

Dispersion 

Thai Sea Boundary

Utilization 

Fishery: Small Trading

External links
http://www.fishbase.org/summary/7355

References

Fish of Thailand
octofasciatus
Fish described in 1926